Meridian Tower is a  Navajo Sandstone mountain in Zion National Park in Washington County, Utah, United States, that is part of the Towers of the Virgin

Description
Its neighbors include The West Temple, The Sundial, The Witch Head, Altar of Sacrifice, Bee Hive, and The Sentinel. This feature was so named by the park's third superintendent, Preston P. Patraw, because its flat top is crossed by the 113th meridian. Meridian Tower's name was officially adopted in 1934 by the U.S. Board on Geographic Names. The first ascent of Meridian Tower was not made until March 2016 by Dan Stih and Matt Mower.

Climate
Spring and fall are the most favorable seasons to view Meridian Tower. According to the Köppen climate classification system, it is located in a Cold semi-arid climate zone, which is defined by the coldest month having an average mean temperature below 32 °F (0 °C), and at least 50% of the total annual precipitation being received during the spring and summer.

See also

 List of mountains of Utah
 Geology of the Zion and Kolob canyons area
 Colorado Plateau

References

External links

 Zion National Park National Park Service
 Meridian Tower: Weather forecast

Mountains of Utah
Zion National Park
Mountains of Washington County, Utah
Sandstone formations of the United States
North American 2000 m summits